Another Day in Paradise is Strung Out's debut album with Fat Wreck Chords.  The album was released on June 20, 1994. It was remastered and re-released on April 15, 2014 as part of the first volume of Strung Out's 20th anniversary box set, featuring the remastered tracks from The Skinny Years...Before We Got Fat as bonus tracks.

Track listing
All lyrics by Jason Cruz except * by Jim Cherry
All leads by Rob Ramos
"Population Control" – 2:13 (Rob)
"Lost?" – 1:46 (Jim*)
"Drag Me Down" – 2:15 (Rob, Jake)
"In Harm's Way" – 2:32 (Jim*)
"Talking to Myself" – 1:44 (Jim, Jake)
"Broken" – 2:10 (Jim, Rob)
"Ashes" – 2:35 (Rob)
"Faulter" – 2:41 (Jim, Jake)
"Away" – 2:03 (Jim)
"Alone" – 2:19 (Jim, Rob)
"Unclean" – 2:35 (Rob)
"Mad Mad World" – 2:22 (Jim*)
"14 Days" – 2:06 (Rob)

Personnel
Jason Cruz - Lead vocals
Jake Kiley - Guitar
Rob Ramos - Guitar
Jordan Burns - Drums
Jim Cherry - Bass
Donnell Cameron - Engineer
Fat Mike - Producer
Eddie Shreier - Mastering

References

1994 debut albums
Strung Out albums
Fat Wreck Chords albums